The 2023 FAI F3P World Championships was held from 19 to 25 March 2023 in Jonava, Lithuania.

Medalists

Medal Table

Seniors

Juniors

Stage winners

References

External links
Official site

2023 in air sports
Shooting
International sports competitions hosted by Lithuania
World championships in aerial sports
Sport in Jonava
FAI
FAI